Phixx were an English-Irish boy band formed in 2003 from the five runners up on British TV show Popstars: The Rivals. The original members were Andrew Kinlochan, Chris Park, Mikey Green, Peter Smith, and Nikk Mager. Between 2003 and 2005, they achieved four top 20 singles in the UK. They broke up in 2006.

Band history
In February 2003, they signed to Hyperactive Management, who had previously been successful with Liberty X.  In October 2003, they released their first single, "Hold on Me", on the Concept Records label, which charted at number 10 in the UK, selling over 60,000 copies. March 2004 saw the release of their second single, "Love Revolution". This sold over 50,000 copies and charted at number 13.

The videos and dance routines for their first two singles aroused media attention for their content, as they often featured the band topless or naked, often in sexually suggestive and aggressive situations with other men.

The third single, released in June 2004, was a cover of Duran Duran's "Wild Boys". During the release week, one version of the single was disqualified from the chart for being a few seconds too long, so the single dropped from the midweek chart position of 9, to number 23; however, an appeal was made to the chart regulators and both versions were eventually counted, giving a final position of number 12. The single sold over 65,000 copies.

Just after the release of "Wild Boys", Peter Smith announced he was leaving to pursue a solo career and to give him more time to write music.

In autumn 2004, Phixx toured South Africa, where they were already popular. They released their debut album, Electrophonic Revolution, there and it became the best-selling album for their South African record company Sheer Music. The band co-wrote some of the songs for the album with Lee Ryan from Blue, Brian McFadden (formerly of Westlife), Alistair Griffin, Ultra, and Theo from Liberty X. All the tracks were produced by John McLaughlin, who had previously worked with Busted.

In December 2004, the band recorded a Christmas song written by Matt Baker for the children's show Blue Peter. This song was available as a free download from the Blue Peter website in the weeks leading up to Christmas, but was never released for sale.

In January 2005, they released their fourth UK single, "Strange Love" (written by Judie Tzuke), which entered the UK Singles Chart at number 19. 

In May 2005, Nikk Mager also left the band. They continued to perform around England and Ireland as a three piece, and spent six months in the recording studio, writing and recording new material. In November 2005, Chris Park announced that the remaining members of Phixx would be breaking up for good in 2006, in order to work on their own solo projects. 

Band members made appearances on the music panel game, Never Mind the Buzzcocks. Green appeared on the show in 2004, followed by Park a year later. Both appeared as panellists on Phill Jupitus' team. In 2006, fellow band member Mager appeared in the Identity Parade line-up, where the panellists were asked to pick out a forgotten star from a group of five. 

In 2008, Mager also appeared in the audition stage of The X Factor, but he was eliminated after his performance of "The Rose". Phixx appeared at number 35 in Chantelle's Top 50 Reality TV Stars.

Like Liberty X, who were formed from the runners up on the first series of Popstars, Phixx had a much longer career than the male winners of Popstars: The Rivals, One True Voice, who split up in 2003 after releasing just two singles. Phixx by contrast were active until 2006, and released several singles and an LP during their time together.

In 2013, Peter Smith appeared on The Voice of Ireland, but none of the coaches turned their chairs for him.

Discography

Albums
 Electrophonic Revolution (2004)

Singles
"Hold on Me" (2003) - UK #10
"Love Revolution" (2004) - UK #13
"Wild Boys" (2004) - UK #12
"Strange Love" (2005) - UK #19

See also
 One True Voice
 Clea
 Javine Hylton
 Girls Aloud
 Hear'Say
 Liberty X
 The Cheeky Girls

References

External links
 Phixx's official Myspace
 Phixx at Sheer Music SA
 

English pop music groups
English boy bands
2002 establishments in England
Musical groups established in 2002
2006 disestablishments in England
Musical groups disestablished in 2006